Schön Properties is a Dubai-based real estate developer.  The company generated a gross development value of over USD $ 2 billion.  It was founded in 1971 in Singapore by the Schon family, which originated in Pakistan.  The company has been involved in several development projects in Dubai, including the Schon Business Park project and Dubai Lagoons in Dubai Investment Park which was started in 2005, but was hit hard by the financial crisis of 2007–2008 and those projects were put on hold.  In 2015, the company successfully delivered 1.6 million square feet project called Schon Business Park, consisting of 72 retail outlets and 304 offices.

In February 2017, Xanadu acquired Dubai Lagoon from Schon Properties for an undisclosed sum. The new developer Xanadu took over the project and purchased it with all its assets and liabilities, including the customers of Dubai Lagoon 

In August 2018, the Dubai agency cancelled two of Schon's projects, iSuites Smart Residences and Ava Residences.  In August 2019, Schon Properties signed an agreement with its investors to complete Dubai Lagoon Lotus project.  Schon commended the Real Estate Regulatory Authority officials for paving the way for completion of the Dubai Lagoon Lotus project along with their investors and contractors.  The housing project comprises 442 units and is 500,000 square feet.  

In March 2022, it was reported that properties from the Dubai Lagoon project had been given to different developers in order to complete the development.

Pakistan Super League
That month it also launched another project in the investment park called iSuites, in a joint venture with the Al Hamad Group.

In November 2018, Pakistan Cricket Board (PCB) along with Schon Properties mutually ended the eight-year ownership rights of Multan Sultans. A joint statement issued by Schon Properties and the PCB said that all rights in respect to the team have returned to the board.

Controversy
In August of 2018 Dubai Land Department seized assets of Schon properties alleging that the company had exploited its investors. The agency also directed its investors to make payments into escrow accounts, in order to protect investors while the agency prepared to bring legal proceedings against the company.

References

External links
 

Real estate companies established in 1971
Multan Sultans